The women's singles of the 2011 Strabag Prague Open tournament was played on clay in Prague, Czech Republic.

Ágnes Szávay was the defending champion but chose to compete in Madrid instead.
Lucie Hradecká won the title, defeating Paula Ormaechea 4–6, 6–3, 6–2 in the final.

Seeds

Draw

Finals

Top half

Bottom half

External links
Main Draw
Qualifying Singles
Official website Archived

Strabag Prague Open - Singles
2011 - Women's Singles
2011 in Czech women's sport